SDN48 (read "S.D.N. Forty-eight", short for Saturday Night 48) was a Japanese idol girl group, created and produced by Yasushi Akimoto. SDN48 was created based on an "adult idol" concept. Former AKB48 member Kayo Noro was chosen as the captain of the group. In November 2010, the group made their major label debut with "Gagaga".  The group ended with a farewell concert on March 31, 2012.

History

2008-2009: Formation 
In 2008, AKB48 producer Yasushi Akimoto decided to create a "Saturday Night 48" show, based on the concept of an "Adult idol" that would perform every Saturday at 10 pm. The shows were restricted to fans aged 18 and older. He also wanted to differentiate from AKB48's usual uniforms with sexier attire. In July 2009, two AKB48 members, Megumi Ohori and Kayo Noro were chosen as the first two members of the group. At the same time auditions were held to find other members. The SDN48 debut stage  was held on July 25. At the end of AKB48's three-day Nippon Budokan concert the teams were reshuffled, leading to the removal of Kayo Noro, Megumi Ohori, Yukari Sato, and Kazumi Urano, leaving them to focus solely on SDN48 activities. Noro was also made the captain of the group.

It was announced on September 27, 2009, that understudy Yuki Iwata had departed from the group due to health reasons. Two months later, Eiko Maeda was transferred from sister group SKE48 to SDN48. Upon joining the group Maeda changed her stage name to Machiko Tezuka.

2010-2011: Major label debut 
During their first anniversary concert, Noro announced to the audience that SDN48 would debut under Universal Music in the fall. The group  also suggested they would be eliminating the age restriction. Through their TV show, SDN48 held a  election to determine the top twelve members who would participate in their debut single. Former AKB48 member Megumi Ohori won No. 1 and was given the center position. The single would be titled "Gagaga" and be released on November 24, 2010. On September 30, 2nd generation member Sakura Fukuyama announced through her blog that she would be leaving the group due to health problems. Chinese member Chen Qu was chosen as Fukuyama replacement. The group was scheduled to release their second single  on 23 March 2011; however, due to the Tōhoku earthquake and tsunami on 11 March, the single was postponed until 6 April.

2012: Disbandment 
On March 31, 2012, all the members graduated from the group and the group was disbanded. On April 19, 2012, former SDN48 members participated in AKB48's 2nd revival stage concert which took place on May 15.

2013: Reunion & New Projects 
On March 31, 2013, one year after the disbandment, an SDN48 reunion concert was held at AKB48 theater.

On May 6, 2013, it was announced that seven former members were creating a new group, called 7cm. The group was under the Avex label and the members include Juri Kaida, KONAN, Mana Ito, Haruka Umeda, Megumi Imayoshi, Mami Kato and Miyuu Hosoda. The group disbanded on August 30, 2013.

Members

1st Generation

 Kazue Akita
 Megumi Imayoshi
 Haruka Umeda
 Kazumi Urano (Former AKB48 Team B member)
 Misa Okochi
 Megumi Ohori (Former AKB48 Team K member)
 Jyuri Kaida
 Mami Kato
 Masami Kochi
 Haruka Kohara (Former AKB48 Team B member)

 Sayaka Kondo
 Yukari Sato (Former AKB48 Team A member)
 Serina
 Chen Qu
 Machiko Tezuka (Former SKE48 member)
 Nachu
 Reiko Nishikunihara
 Kayo Noro (Captain; Former AKB48 Team K member)
 Chisaki Hatakeyama
 Hiromi Mitsui

2nd Generation 

 Yuki Aikawa
 Akiko
 Mana Ito
 Aimi Oyama
 Yuki Kimoto
 Konan
 Yui Takahashi

 Marina Tsuda
 Natsuko
 Akane Fukuda
 Yumi Fujikoso
 Miyuu Hosoda
 Rumi Matsushima

3rd Generation 

 Seara Kojo
 Hitomi Komatani  (Former AKB48 Team A member)
 Saemi Shinahama
 Jung Si-yeon
 Hana Tojima (Former AKB48 Team A member)
 Miray

Former members 
 Ayami Nakazato (Graduated December 24, 2009) a former Kishidan backdancer, and OZ-MAX member Ayami of DJ OZMA
 Sakura Fukuyama (Graduated October 2010)
 Kana Ito (Graduated February 2011)
 Yuka Ninomiya (Graduated May 2011)
 Tomomi Tanisaki (Graduated May 2011)
 Sayo Hayakawa (Graduated July 2011)
Understudy
 Yuki Iwata (Withdrew September 24, 2009)

Discography

Singles

Albums

SDN48 1st Stage "Yuuwaku no Garter" 

All SDN48's members did perform only one stage, "Yuuwaku no Garter". They usually were divided as 1st and 2nd/3rd generation stages. They performed at the AKB Theater.

References

External links 
 SDN48's Universal Music website 

AKB48 Group
Japanese girl groups
Japanese idol groups
Musical groups established in 2009
Universal Music Japan artists
Japanese pop music groups
2009 establishments in Japan
Musical groups from Akihabara
Musical groups disestablished in 2012
2012 disestablishments in Japan